In enzymology, a lactaldehyde dehydrogenase is an enzyme that catalyzes the chemical reaction

(S)-lactaldehyde + NAD+ + H2O  (S)-lactate + NADH + 2 H+

The 3 substrates of this enzyme are (S)-lactaldehyde, NAD+, and H2O, whereas its 3 products are (S)-lactate, NADH, and H+.

This enzyme belongs to the family of oxidoreductases, specifically those acting on the aldehyde or oxo group of donor with NAD+ or NADP+ as acceptor.  The systematic name of this enzyme class is (S)-lactaldehyde:NAD+ oxidoreductase. Other names in common use include L-lactaldehyde:NAD+ oxidoreductase, and nicotinamide adenine dinucleotide (NAD+)-linked dehydrogenase.  This enzyme participates in pyruvate metabolism.

Structural studies

References

 
 

EC 1.2.1
NADH-dependent enzymes
Enzymes of known structure